Udea lampadias is a moth of the family Crambidae. It is endemic to the Hawaiian islands of Maui and Hawaii.

External links

Moths described in 1904
Endemic moths of Hawaii
lampadias